The Women's 100m Breaststroke event at the 2003 Pan American Games took place on August 15, 2003 (Day 15 of the Games).

Medalists

Records

Results

References

2003 Pan American Games Results: Day 13, CBC online; retrieved 2009-06-13.
usaswimming

Breaststroke, Women's 100m
2003 in women's swimming
Swim